Arthur Edwin Hill (9 January 1888 – 5 June 1966) was a British water polo player who competed in the 1912 Summer Olympics.  He was part of the British team, which was successful in winning a gold medal at the Stockholm Olympiad.
Arthur Hill served in World War 1 and was a swimming champion in the Canadian Expeditionary Forces.  He went on to represent New York Athletics Club in 1922 and several English counties: Staffordshire, 1908 to 1913, Sussex, 1923 to 1927 and Kent, 1928.
Arthur Hill was Vice-President of Plaistow United Swimming Club, which won the English Water Polo Championship in the 1928/29 season.

In the 1930s, Arthur Hill and his wife, Marjorie, ran a pub called the Woodman, Plumstead Common, London SE16.

See also
 Great Britain men's Olympic water polo team records and statistics
 List of Olympic champions in men's water polo
 List of Olympic medalists in water polo (men)

References

External links

 

1888 births
1966 deaths
British male water polo players
Water polo players at the 1912 Summer Olympics
Olympic water polo players of Great Britain
English Olympic medallists
Olympic gold medallists for Great Britain
Olympic medalists in water polo
Medalists at the 1912 Summer Olympics
20th-century British people